The Tschingelhörner (also spelled Tschingelhoren) are a chain of mountain peaks in the Glarus Alps, located on the border between the Swiss cantons of Glarus and Graubünden. The mountain is located between Elm and Flims, west of the Segnas Pass (2,627 m). East of the main summit is the Martinsloch, a 6-by-18-metre (20-by-60 ft) triangular breakthrough, or hole, through which the sun shines at particular times of the year.

The mountain is part of the Swiss Tectonic Arena Sardona and is a UNESCO World Heritage Site.

References

External links
 Tschingelhörner on Hikr

Mountains of the Alps
Mountains of Switzerland
World Heritage Sites in Switzerland
Mountains of the canton of Glarus
Mountains of Graubünden
Glarus–Graubünden border
Two-thousanders of Switzerland
Flims